Kenneth Douglas Lane is an American theoretical particle physicist and professor of physics at Boston University.  Lane is best known for his role in the development of extended technicolor models of physics beyond the Standard Model.

Career 
Lane received his B.Sc. and M.Sc. in physics at the Georgia Institute of Technology, and was a student of Chung Wook Kim at Johns Hopkins University, where he received his Ph.D. in 1970.

His physics research focuses on the problems of electroweak and flavor symmetry breaking.  With Estia J. Eichten, Lane co-invented extended technicolor.  He and Eichten also contributed to early work on charmonium with Kurt Gottfried, Tom Kinoshita and Tung-Mow Yan.

In 1984 he coauthored "Supercollider Physics" (with Eichten, Ian Hinchliffe and Chris Quigg), which has strongly influenced the quest for future discoveries at hadron colliders such as the Fermilab Tevatron the SSC, and the LHC at CERN.  In 2011 Dr Lane with Chris Quigg, Estia Eichten, and Ian Hinchliffe won the J. J. Sakurai Prize for Theoretical Particle Physics "For their work, separately and collectively, to chart a course of the exploration of TeV scale physics using multi-TeV hadron colliders" 

He was elected a Fellow of the American Physical Society in 1990 "for original contributions to the theory of electroweak symmetry breaking and Supercollider physics"

References

External links
 Profile at Boston University.
 Lane's publications on SPIRES.

Year of birth missing (living people)
Living people
21st-century American physicists
Particle physicists
Jewish American scientists
Boston University faculty
Johns Hopkins University alumni
Georgia Tech alumni
Theoretical physicists
J. J. Sakurai Prize for Theoretical Particle Physics recipients
Fellows of the American Physical Society
21st-century American Jews